Iulian Raicea (born 4 March 1973) is a Romanian sport shooter who competed in the 1992 Summer Olympics, in the 1996 Summer Olympics, in the 2000 Summer Olympics, in the 2004 Summer Olympics, and in the 2008 Summer Olympics.

References

1973 births
Living people
Romanian male sport shooters
ISSF pistol shooters
Olympic shooters of Romania
Shooters at the 1992 Summer Olympics
Shooters at the 1996 Summer Olympics
Shooters at the 2000 Summer Olympics
Shooters at the 2004 Summer Olympics
Shooters at the 2008 Summer Olympics
Olympic bronze medalists for Romania
Olympic medalists in shooting
Medalists at the 2000 Summer Olympics